Dryas (Ancient Greek: , gen. , from  "oak") is the name of several figures in Greek mythology, including:

 Dryas, an Egyptian prince as one of the sons of King Aegyptus. His mother was the naiad Caliadne and thus full brother of Eurylochus, Phantes, Peristhenes, Hermus, Potamon, Cisseus, Lixus, Imbrus, Bromius, Polyctor and Chthonius. In some accounts, he could be a son of Aegyptus either by Eurryroe, daughter of the river-god Nilus, or Isaie, daughter of King Agenor of Tyre. Dryas suffered the same fate as his other brothers, save Lynceus, when they were slain on their wedding night by their wives who obeyed the command of their father King Danaus of Libya. He married the Danaid Hecabe or Eurydice, daughter of Danaus and the naiad Polyxo.
 Dryas, a Thracian prince as son of King Lycurgus, king of the Edoni in Thrace. He was killed when Lycurgus went insane and mistook him for a mature trunk of ivy, a plant holy to the god Dionysus, whose cult Lycurgus was attempting to extirpate.
 Dryas, father of the aforementioned Lycurgus, and thus grandfather of the above Dryas.
 Dryas, a leader of the Lapiths against the Centaurs, and a participant of the battle that began at the wedding of Pirithous and Hippodamia, where he killed the Centaur Rhoetus, who had killed his fellow Lapiths Corythus and Euagrus just before that. In Iliad 1, Nestor numbers Dryas among an earlier generation of heroes of his youth, "the strongest men that Earth has bred, the strongest men against the strongest enemies, a savage mountain-dwelling tribe [i. e. the Centaurs] whom they utterly destroyed", and call him "shepherd of the people". No trace of such an oral tradition, which Homer's listeners would have recognized in Nestor's allusion, survived in literary epic.
Dryas, son of Ares or of Iapetus.
 Dryas the seer, father of Munichus.
 Dryas, one of the suitors of Pallene, daughter of Sithon. He was killed by Cleitus, who then went on to marry Pallene.
 Dryas, father of Amphilochus, the husband of Alcinoe.
 Dryas, son of Orion, a chieftain from Tanagra. He brought 1000 archers with him to defend Thebes in the Seven against Thebes. Ares made use of the fact that Dryas shared his father's hate of Artemis and her followers, and turned him against Parthenopaeus and his Arcadian contingent. Upon killing Parthenopaeus, Dryas was himself felled by an unknown hand.
 Dryas, a Greek warrior killed during the Trojan War by Deiphobus.

Notes

References 
 Antoninus Liberalis, The Metamorphoses of Antoninus Liberalis translated by Francis Celoria (Routledge 1992). Online version at the Topos Text Project.
Apollodorus, The Library with an English Translation by Sir James George Frazer, F.B.A., F.R.S. in 2 Volumes, Cambridge, MA, Harvard University Press; London, William Heinemann Ltd. 1921. . Online version at the Perseus Digital Library. Greek text available from the same website.
Conon, Fifty Narrations, surviving as one-paragraph summaries in the Bibliotheca (Library) of Photius, Patriarch of Constantinople translated from the Greek by Brady Kiesling. Online version at the Topos Text Project.
Gaius Julius Hyginus, Fabulae from The Myths of Hyginus translated and edited by Mary Grant. University of Kansas Publications in Humanistic Studies. Online version at the Topos Text Project.
Hesiod, Shield of Heracles from The Homeric Hymns and Homerica with an English Translation by Hugh G. Evelyn-White, Cambridge, MA.,Harvard University Press; London, William Heinemann Ltd. 1914. Online version at the Perseus Digital Library. Greek text available from the same website.
Homer, The Iliad with an English Translation by A.T. Murray, Ph.D. in two volumes. Cambridge, MA., Harvard University Press; London, William Heinemann, Ltd. 1924. . Online version at the Perseus Digital Library.
Homer, Homeri Opera in five volumes. Oxford, Oxford University Press. 1920. . Greek text available at the Perseus Digital Library.
Parthenius, Love Romances translated by Sir Stephen Gaselee (1882-1943), S. Loeb Classical Library Volume 69. Cambridge, MA. Harvard University Press. 1916.  Online version at the Topos Text Project.
Parthenius, Erotici Scriptores Graeci, Vol. 1. Rudolf Hercher. in aedibus B. G. Teubneri. Leipzig. 1858. Greek text available at the Perseus Digital Library.
Publius Ovidius Naso, Metamorphoses translated by Brookes More (1859-1942). Boston, Cornhill Publishing Co. 1922. Online version at the Perseus Digital Library.
Publius Ovidius Naso, Metamorphoses. Hugo Magnus. Gotha (Germany). Friedr. Andr. Perthes. 1892. Latin text available at the Perseus Digital Library.
Publius Papinius Statius, The Thebaid translated by John Henry Mozley. Loeb Classical Library Volumes. Cambridge, MA, Harvard University Press; London, William Heinemann Ltd. 1928. Online version at the Topos Text Project.
Publius Papinius Statius, The Thebaid. Vol I-II. John Henry Mozley. London: William Heinemann; New York: G.P. Putnam's Sons. 1928. Latin text available at the Perseus Digital Library.
Quintus Smyrnaeus, The Fall of Troy translated by Way. A. S. Loeb Classical Library Volume 19. London: William Heinemann, 1913. Online version at theio.com
Quintus Smyrnaeus, The Fall of Troy. Arthur S. Way. London: William Heinemann; New York: G.P. Putnam's Sons. 1913. Greek text available at the Perseus Digital Library.
Sophocles, The Antigone of Sophocles edited with introduction and notes by Sir Richard Jebb. Cambridge. Cambridge University Press. 1893. Online version at the Perseus Digital Library.
Sophocles, Sophocles. Vol 1: Oedipus the king. Oedipus at Colonus. Antigone. With an English translation by F. Storr. The Loeb classical library, 20. Francis Storr. London; New York. William Heinemann Ltd.; The Macmillan Company. 1912. Greek text available at the Perseus Digital Library.

Further reading 
Robert Graves, (1955) 1960. The Greek Myths 27.e.
 Homer, Iliad vi. 530–40.
 Karl Kerenyi, 1976. Dionysos: Archetypal Image of Indestructible Life (Princeton: Bollingen) Translated by Ralph Manheim.

Quercus
Achaeans (Homer)
Mythological Greek seers
Princes in Greek mythology
Greek mythology of Thrace
Plants in mythology